Tautovo (Tavăt) is a rural locality (a village) in Alikovsky District of the Chuvash Republic, (Russia), located  from the district's administrative center of Alikovo. The village is the administrative center of Tautovskoye Rural Settlement, one of the municipal formations of Alikovsky District.

The chief of the municipal formation is Svetlana Y. Zheleznova.

References

Further reading
L. A. Efimov, "Элӗк Енӗ", Alikovo, 1994.
"Аликовская энциклопедия", (Encyklopaedia of Alikovo) editors: Efimov L.A., Efimov E.L., Ananjev A. A., Terentjev G. K., Cheboksary, 2009, .

External links
Official website of Tautskoye Rural Settlement 

Alikovsky District

Rural localities in Chuvashia
Kurmyshsky Uyezd